Kalingi (also spelt as Kalinga Kshatriya'' & Kalinji''') [1] is a caste residing in the Indian states of Andhra Pradesh and Odisha. They are found mainly in Srikakulam, Vizianagaram, Vishakapatnam, and are also found on the borderland between the districts of Ganjam and Visakhapatnam.

They are an endogamous population. These people wear sacred threads (yagnopavita) across the shoulders. These people are also considered as suryavamsa kshatriya[2] The same class of people are known as the Kalinjis in the country north of the Vamsadhara river.[3] There are four groups of Kalingas today, Buragam and Kinthali Kalingas especially in andhra state with titles varma ,Rao.Other two unpopularly subgroups were Kalinga Brahmana with titles panda,patro,sahoo,panigrahi and Kalinga Raju(kshatriyas). These groups generally distinguished by sacred threads and gotras. Those who are not wearing sacred thread were considered as Agrarian clan and those who wear sacred threads and having Brahmin gotras were themselves considered as direct  descendants of the former rulers of the region who fought with Ashoka. In the Telugu parts they are called Kalingis and in the Oriya country they are known as Kalinjis. The Kalinjis do not wear the sacred thread. Both Kinthala and Buragam Kalingas are categorized as Other Backward Classes (OBCs) by the Government of Andhra Pradesh. Kinthala widows are permitted to remarry if they have no male heir, but Buragam widows are not. These Kalingis are not found south of Chipurupalle in the Vizianagaram district.[5] These were the original people that gave their name to the region; most of them are now found confined to the south of Ganjam district, but some are found scattered all over the Oriya country along the coast.

References

External links
 

Indian castes
Social groups of Andhra Pradesh